Mauro Néstor Gerk also known as El Tanque or El delantero del amor (born 9 May 1977), is an Argentine football manager and former striker who last played for Cruz Azul Hidalgo in the Ascenso MX. Since May 30, 2022 he is the Querétaro F.C. manager.

Career
Gerk played several seasons with Querétaro F.C., becoming a fan favorite before moving to Tijuana. He made his first appearance with Querétaro against Monterrey in the Apertura 2006.

Honours
 Primera A Top Goalscorer: Apertura 2008
 Trofeo Bravo 2008

References

1977 births
Living people
Argentine footballers
Argentine emigrants to Mexico
Naturalized citizens of Mexico
Newell's Old Boys footballers
Quilmes Atlético Club footballers
Club Atlético Atlanta footballers
Club Celaya footballers
Querétaro F.C. footballers
Dorados de Sinaloa footballers
Club Tijuana footballers
Liga MX players
Association football forwards
Footballers from Buenos Aires